Ultraelectromagneticjam!: The Music of the Eraserheads is the first tribute album for the popular Filipino alternative band The Eraserheads. It was named after the band's first studio album UltraElectroMagneticPop!. The album was released under Musiko Records & Sony BMG Music Philippines, Inc.) on November 29, 2005 and consists of 17 Eraserheads songs that were interpreted by Philippine bands and solo musical artists such as 6cyclemind, Imago, Barbie Almalbis, Spongecola, Kitchie Nadal and MYMP. The album contains the songs "Alapaap", "Magasin", "With a Smile", "Pare Ko", "Ang Huling El Bimbo" and "Maling Akala".

Track listing

Notes 
 "Alapaap" was also covered by 6CycleMind in 2012 except the vocals are the new frontman Tutti Caringal (formerly from Protein Shake) and duet with Eunice Jorge of the pop rock band Gracenote. This was released on the  compilation album The Reunion: An Eraserheads Tribute Album.
 Brownman Revival's rendition of "Maling Akala" also appears on their first studio album Steady Lang in 2005.

References

Tribute albums
2005 compilation albums